The Christian Democratic Party of Uruguay is a political party of the Christian left.

History
The party was established in 1911 as the Civic Union, having developed out of the Catholic Party that contested the 1910 elections. In February 1962 it was renamed the Christian Democratic Party. A faction broke away in 1966, initially running under the name Christian Civic Movement, before becoming the Christian Radical Union, and later reclaiming the Civic Union name.

Affiliation
It is part of the governing coalition Broad Front (Frente Amplio). It is a part of the Progressive Alliance, which in turn forms part of the Liber Seregni Front uniting the more moderate centre-left and centrist sectors of the Broad Front.

Programme
Its platform calls for "a communitarian society" and a "social state", as well as "absolute respect for human life" (including opposition to abortion). It further calls for "alternative forms of production, distribution, consumption and accumulation" that are "superior to capitalist and state-owned enterprises", including:

 a social market economy
 cooperatives
 self-management or self-governing enterprises (autogestión)
 ecological economics
 respect for the commons
 support for the nonprofit sector

References

External links
 Official website

1911 establishments in Uruguay
Broad Front (Uruguay)
Catholic social teaching
Christian democratic parties in South America
Political parties established in 1911
Political parties in Uruguay